Saint-Omer-en-Chaussée is a commune in the Oise department in northern France. Saint-Omer-en-Chaussée station has rail connections to Beauvais and Le Tréport.

See also
 Communes of the Oise department

References

Communes of Oise